The adjective abstract has often been applied to differential geometry before, but the abstract differential geometry (ADG) of this article is a form of differential geometry without the calculus notion of smoothness, developed by Anastasios Mallios and Ioannis Raptis from 1998 onwards.

Instead of calculus, an axiomatic treatment of differential geometry is built via sheaf theory and sheaf cohomology using vector sheaves in place of bundles based on arbitrary topological spaces. Mallios says noncommutative geometry can be considered a special case of ADG, and that ADG is similar to synthetic differential geometry.

Applications

ADG Gravity
Mallios and Raptis use ADG to avoid the singularities in general relativity and propose this as a route to quantum gravity.

See also
Discrete differential geometry
Analysis on fractals

References

Further reading
Space-time foam dense singularities and de Rham cohomology, A Mallios, EE Rosinger, Acta Applicandae Mathematicae, 2001

Differential geometry
Sheaf theory
General relativity
Quantum gravity